Agnewia is a genus of sea snails, marine gastropod mollusks in the family Muricidae, the murex snails or rock snails.

Species
Species within the genus Agnewia include:
 Agnewia adelaidae (A. Adams & Angas, 1863)
 † Agnewia kempae Powell, 1934
 Agnewia tritoniformis (Blainville, 1833)
Species brought into synonymy
 Agnewia nautica Thornley, 1952: synonym of Agnewia tritoniformis (Blainville, 1832)

References

 Claremont M., Vermeij G.J., Williams S.T. & Reid D.G. (2013) Global phylogeny and new classification of the Rapaninae (Gastropoda: Muricidae), dominant molluscan predators on tropical rocky seashores. Molecular Phylogenetics and Evolution 66: 91–102.

External links
 Forbes E. (1852). On the Mollusca collected by Mr MacGillivray during the voyage of the Rattlesnake. Pp. 360-386, pls 2-3, in: MacGillivray J. (ed.). Narrative of the voyage of the H.M.S. Rattlesnake, commanded by the late Captain Owen Stanley, during the years 1846-1850, volume 2 . London: T. & W. Boone. 395 pp
 Tenison-Woods J.E. (1878 ["1877"]). Census; with brief descriptions of the marine shells of Tasmania and the adjacent islands. Papers and Proceedings of the Royal Society of Tasmania. (1877): 26-57
 Dunker, W. (1857). Mollusca nova collectionis Cumingianae. Proceedings of the Zoological Society of London. 24: 354-358
 Tan K. S. (2003) Phylogenetic analysis and taxonomy of some southern Australian and New Zealand Muricidae (Mollusca: Neogastropoda). Journal of Natural History 37(8): 911-1028
 Beu, A.G. 2011 Marine Molluscs of oxygen isotope stages of the last 2 million years in New Zealand. Part 4. Gastropoda (Ptenoglossa, Neogastropoda, Heterobranchia). Journal of the Royal Society of New Zealand 41, 1–153

 
Gastropod genera